Babia Góra National Park is one of the 23 national parks in Poland, located in the southern part of the country, in Lesser Poland Voivodeship, on the border with Slovakia. The park has its headquarters in the village of Zawoja.

There is a protected area Horná Orava Protected Landscape Area on the Slovak side of the massif.

The area of Babia Góra was first brought under legal protection in 1933, when the Babia Góra Reserve was created. On October 30, 1954, it was designated a National Park. Since 1976 it has been listed by UNESCO as a biosphere reserve under the Man and the Biosphere (MaB) programme. The area of the biosphere reserve was extended in 2001.

Fauna
105 species of birds (including woodpeckers and eagle owls)
Animals such as deer, lynx, wolves and bears
Insects, especially beetles, including some that are unique to the area

Gallery

External links 

Parks in Lesser Poland Voivodeship
National parks of Poland
Biosphere reserves of Poland
Protected areas established in 1954
Protected areas of the Western Carpathians
1954 establishments in Poland